Villas, Florida  is an unincorporated community and census-designated place (CDP) in Lee County, Florida, United States. It is part of the Cape Coral-Fort Myers, Florida Metropolitan Statistical Area.

Geography
Villas is located in central Lee County at  (26.555003, -81.869036). It is an unincorporated community, bordered to the north by Page Park and Pine Manor and to the west by Whiskey Creek and Cypress Lake, all unincorporated as well. U.S. Route 41 passes through Villas, leading north  to the center of Fort Myers, the Lee county seat, and south  to Estero.

Demographics

As of the census of 2000, there were 11,346 people, 5,682 households, and 2,909 families residing in the CDP. The racial makeup of the CDP was 94.23% White, 1.65% African American, 0.17% Native American, 1.17% Asian, 0.04% Pacific Islander, 1.33% from other races, and 1.41% from two or more races. Hispanic or Latino of any race were 5.59% of the population.

There were 5,682 households, out of which 15.7% had children under the age of 18 living with them, 40.4% were married couples living together, 8.1% had a female householder with no husband present, and 48.8% were non-families. 38.7% of all households were made up of individuals, and 17.1% had someone living alone who was 65 years of age or older.  The average household size was 1.94 and the average family size was 2.56.

In the CDP, the population was spread out, with 13.6% under the age of 18, 7.7% from 18 to 24, 28.2% from 25 to 44, 21.2% from 45 to 64, and 29.3% who were 65 years of age or older.  The median age was 45 years. For every 100 females, there were 87.3 males.  For every 100 females age 18 and over, there were 84.4 males.

The median income for a household in the CDP was $40,483, and the median income for a family was $49,975. Males had a median income of $31,517 versus $25,782 for females. The per capita income for the CDP was $25,880.  About 3.5% of families and 6.5% of the population were below the poverty line, including 8.9% of those under age 18 and 7.2% of those age 65 or over.

References

Census-designated places in Lee County, Florida
Census-designated places in Florida